Ralph of Longchamp (c. 1155 – c. 1215) was a scholastic philosopher of the 13th century, known also as a physician and natural philosopher. He taught at Oxford and possibly at Paris.

He was a pupil of Alain of Lille  and wrote a commentary on Alain's poem Anticlaudianus, in about 1212.

References
 Jan Sulowski (1972), In Anticlaudianum Alani commentum by Radulphus de Longo Campo
 Darko Senekovic, Der Anticlaudianus-Kommentar des Radulphus de Longo Campo. Zur Kommentierungspraxis im Hochmittelalter, in: Sinnvermittlung. Studien zur Geschichte von Exegese und Hermeneutik I, edd. Paul Michel – Hans Weder, Zürich 2000, S. 475-496.

Notes

External links
 List of works

13th-century English people
1150s births
1210s deaths
Scholastic philosophers